Thorlak Thorhallsson (Icelandic: Þorlákur Þórhallsson; 1133 – 23 December 1193) is the patron saint of Iceland. He was bishop of Skálholt from 1178 until his death. Thorlak's relics were translated to the cathedral of Skalholt in 1198, not long after his successor as bishop, Páll Jónsson, announced at the Althing that vows could be made to Thorlak. His status as a saint did not receive official recognition from the Catholic Church until 14 January 1984, when John Paul II canonized him and declared him the patron saint of Iceland. His feast day is 23 December, when Thorlac's mass is celebrated in Iceland.

Career
Born in 1133 at Hlíðarendi in the see of Skálholt in southern Iceland, Thorlak was from an agrarian family. He was ordained a deacon before he was fifteen and a priest at the age of eighteen. He studied abroad at Paris with the Victorines, where he learned the Rule of Saint Augustine from roughly 1153 to 1159, and then studied canon law in Lincoln.

Returning to Iceland in 1165, Thorlak founded a monastery of Canons Regular at Þykkvabær after refusing to marry a rich widow. There he devoted himself to a strictly religious life, refusing to marry (many other Icelandic priests were married) and devoting himself to reciting the Our Father, the Creed, and a hymn, as well as fifty Psalms.

Thorlak was consecrated a bishop by Augustine of Nidaros and worked to regulate the Augustinian Rule in Iceland, as well as eradicate simony, lay patronage, and clerical incontinency.

Canonization
Thorlak's life and dozens of his miracles are described in great detail in the Icelandic saga Þorláks saga helga (the Saga of Saint Thorlak), republished in Icelandic on the occasion of John Paul II's visit to Iceland in 1989. It seems likely that Thorlak's informal sanctification in the Church in Iceland, promoted by Latin texts on which this was based, "was arranged in Icelandic ecclesiastical circles, clerics of both dioceses being conspicuous in reports of early miracles".

Thorlak was officially recognised as a saint of the Roman Catholic Church on 14 January 1984, when John Paul II canonized him and declared him the patron saint of Iceland.

The sacred reliquary of Thorlak was maintained in the Diocese of Skálholt until it was destroyed in the Reformation, and his mortal remains were strewn about the cathedral grounds. The only known remaining relic of Thorlak is a bone fragment contained with other saints' relics in a lead box in sanctuary's end wall ("The Golden Locker") of the St. Magnus Cathedral, Faroe Islands.

Novena
A novena, or nine-day devotional prayer, in honor of Thorlac was approved in May 2018, by the Bishop of Reykjavík, Iceland for use by all faithful.

Thorlac's mass
The Mass of St. Thorlac (Þorláksmessa) is an Icelandic holiday celebrated every December 23. The celebration honors Saint Thorlak. The day is also celebrated in the Faroe Islands, where it's called Tollaksmessa.

In modern times, Þorláksmessa became part of Christmas, or the last day of preparations before Christmas. Many people buy Christmas presents and finish decorating their houses and Christmas tree. On Þorláksmessa evening in Reykjavík, many stroll down Laugavegur.

Fish was usually eaten on Þorláksmessa since 23 December was the last day of the Catholic Christmas fast. In west fjords in Iceland, it is customary to eat buried and fermented skate along with potatoes on Þorláksmessa. The ammonia-infused odor of fermented skate is quite strong, similar to that of hákarl. This pungent dish is eaten as a continuation of tradition. The skate is usually served with boiled or mashed potatoes, accompanied by a shot of brennivín.

Other
A group based in the state of New York has advocated for Thorlak becoming the patron saint of people with autism.

Autism Consecrated, a blog written by the autistic self-advocate Aimee O'Connell, promotes Saint Thorlak as a role model for autistic Catholics.

See also
 Jól (Iceland)

References

Sources

External links

 
 
 

Saints of December 23: Thorlac Thornalli
Þorláksmessa - The Day of St. Thorlakur: The Icelandic Saint St. Thorlakur

1133 births
1193 deaths
12th-century Christian saints
12th-century Roman Catholic bishops in Iceland
Icelandic Roman Catholic saints
Augustinian canons
Canonical Augustinian bishops
12th-century Icelandic people